Stallworth Stadium is a stadium in Baytown, Texas. It is primarily used for American football and soccer and is the home field of Robert E. Lee High School, Ross S. Sterling High School, and Goose Creek Memorial High School. All three schools are in the Goose Creek Consolidated Independent School District.

The stadium holds 16,500 people and opened in 1969 when Memorial Stadium (now Sultis Stadium) on the Robert E. Lee campus became too small.   Stallworth Stadium is on a neutral site and not on any of the three campuses in GCCISD.

On October 29, 1976, President Gerald Ford attended a game between the Robert E. Lee Ganders and the Aldine-McArthur Generals. The President, on the campaign trail in Houston, stayed long enough to see the Ganders reach a 21–0 lead over the Generals en route to a 34–0 victory.

In addition, the Bayou Bowl, a high school all-star game between players from Louisiana and Texas, takes place annually at the venue. Starting in 2006, the stadium is occasionally used for middle school football games.

The stadium was also the home of the Baytown chapter of The American Cancer Society's Bay Area Relay for Life until it moved to Royal Purple Raceway, due to the GCCISD bus barn in the stadium's parking lot.

The stadium is among the largest non-collegiate fields in the state.

The stadium is named after Robert E. Lee High School coach Dan Stallworth.

Stallworth Stadium is among the largest high school football stadiums by capacity in Texas:

References

Sports venues in Texas
High school football venues in Texas
Baytown, Texas
Greater Houston
Galveston Bay Area
Sports venues in Harris County, Texas